Sidra Medicine is a 400-bed women’s and children’s hospital, medical education and biomedical research center in Doha, Qatar. The hospital first opened its outpatient facility in 2016, followed by its inpatient hospital in January 2018.

Location
Sidra is located in Education City, a city-scale initiative by Qatar Foundation. This portion of Education City is located Al Gharrafa, which in turn is a district of Al Rayyan City in the Municipality of Al Rayyan in Qatar.

Outside the hospital is a series of 14 giant bronze sculptures by Damien Hirst called The Miraculous Journey, graphically charting the development of a baby in the uterus from conception to birth.  It is owned by the Qatar Foundation.

History
Qatar Foundation, a quasi-government organization, allotted a massive $7.9 billion budget for the hospital's construction. It first selected the center's contractors in 2008 but in 2014 assigned new contractors to complete the project.

Biomedical research first began at Sidra in 2015. Outpatient care facilities and services were inaugurated in May 2016; as of 2018 there are at least 50 outpatient facilities. Throughout 2017, more than 25,000 people were treated at the hospital's outpatient clinic.

On 14 January 2018, Sidra launched its inpatient hospital with 400 beds, treating 10 patients on its initial day of opening. The hospital is expected to become fully commissioned sometime in 2018, after the construction of an emergency department and the addition of further services. Future plans will witness an expansion from 400 beds to 550 beds.

Roughly 3,900 staff members were retained by Sidra at the time of inaugurating its inpatient hospital.

See also
 List of hospitals in Qatar

References

External links
Sidra Medical and Research Center website

2018 establishments in Qatar
Hospitals in Qatar
Hospitals established in 2018